Christopher Ariel Shaw is a Canadian neuroscientist and professor of ophthalmology at the University of British Columbia.

Vaccine research 
Shaw has done controversial research on the adverse effects of vaccines, including publishing two 2011 reports about the effect of aluminum adjuvants in vaccines. The World Health Organization's Global Advisory Committee on Vaccine Safety criticized the two 2011 reports, calling them "seriously flawed". The Committee wrote: "The core argument made in these studies is based on ecological comparisons of aluminium content in vaccines and rates of autism spectrum disorders in several countries. In general, ecological studies cannot be used to assert a causal association because they do not link exposure to outcome in individuals, and only make correlations of exposure and outcomes on population averages".  Shaw has received nearly $900,000 in research funding from the Dwoskin Family Foundation and the Katlyn Fox Foundation, both of which question the safety of vaccines. The University of British Columbia and numerous experts said there is no problem with the source of this funding, noting that many researchers accept money from pharmaceutical companies and other entities.

In October 2017, Shaw and his colleague, Lucija Tomljenovic, announced that they were retracting a paper they had co-authored in the Journal of Inorganic Biochemistry, claiming to find that aluminum in vaccines caused symptoms "consistent with those in autism" in mice, after multiple other researchers had criticized the underlying data as invalid or falsified. After seeing some of these criticisms on PubPeer, Shaw and his lab reanalyzed the figures that had been criticized, and requested a retraction from the journal, saying "It appears as if some of the images in mostly what were non-significant results had been flipped. We don't know why, we don't know how … but there was a screw-up, there's no question about that." In response to this retraction, the University of British Columbia issued a statement defending academic freedom as well as Shaw's academic integrity.

In October 2017, Shaw and Tomljenovic and several other coauthors published an article in Open Access Library Journal, published by Scientific Research Publishing, a predatory open access publisher, about a tetanus vaccine that had been used in Kenya in 2014. The authors withdrew the article, then published it again in the same journal.

Shaw was on the Scientific Advisory Board of the anti-vaccine Children's Medical Safety Research Institute, founded and funded by Claire Dwoskin. Dwoskin has used Shaw's studies, conducted at the University of British Columbia, as supposed evidence that vaccines cause autism.

Publications

Books 
 
 
 
 Shaw, Christopher (2018). "Aluminum as a CNS and immune system toxin across the lifespan". In Neurotoxicity of Aluminum. Qiao Niu (Editor). Springer Publishing.

Research articles

Retracted articles

Review articles

References

External links
Faculty page

Canadian neuroscientists
Living people
Academic staff of the University of British Columbia
University of California, Irvine alumni
Hebrew University of Jerusalem alumni
Dalhousie University alumni
Year of birth missing (living people)